Pray TV (also known as KGOD) is a 1981 American comedy film spoofing televangelism, directed and co-written by Rick Friedberg.

The film stars Dabney Coleman, Archie Hahn, Nancy Morgan, Joyce Jameson, Lewis Arquette, Marcia Wallace and Roger E. Mosley, with cameos by Dr. John and the band Devo (who play a Christian rock band named "Dove"). Film critics David Nusair and Scott Weinberg note that the 1989 film UHF is very similar in both plot and style to Pray TV.

Plot
Failing UHF TV station KRUD, Channel 17, is "reborn" as Christian television station KGOD.  The new format is a big success but attracts an incompatible mix of fringe ministries and broadcasters wanting time on the station.  A series of humorous vignettes show the different religious shows the station broadcasts: a faith healer, a radical black nationalist preacher, a preacher with a drive-in church, a Christian game show, etc.

Cast

Release
Pray TV was picked up by Filmways Pictures in 1981 (under its original name, KGOD).  The film premiered on television instead of theatrically, and aired on Showtime in 1983 under its present title. It was issued on DVD on November 15, 2005.

References

External links
 
 

1980 films
American parody films
Parodies of televangelism
1980s parody films
Films about evangelicalism
Films scored by George S. Clinton
Religious comedy films
1980 comedy films
Films directed by Rick Friedberg
Films about television
Films about television people
1980s English-language films
1980s American films
Films about faith healing